Vicente Calabuig Saus (born 3 March 1958) is a former Spanish handball player who competed in the 1980 Summer Olympics. In 1980 he finished fifth with the Spanish team in the Olympic tournament. He played all six matches and scored three goals.

References

External links
 

1958 births
Living people
Spanish male handball players
Olympic handball players of Spain
Handball players at the 1980 Summer Olympics